Carpophthoromyia is a small genus of Afrotropical picture-winged flies (Tephritidae). They are usually darkly coloured and of medium size, and mostly develop in the fruit of various species of Drypetes (Putranjivaceae, formerly Euphorbiaceae). Carpophthoromyia is closely related to Perilampsis. There are 17 recognised species:

Species

Carpophthoromyia debeckeri De Meyer, 2006
Carpophthoromyia dimidiata Bezzi, 1924
Carpophthoromyia dividua De Meyer, 2006
Carpophthoromyia flavofasciata De Meyer, 2006
Carpophthoromyia interrupta De Meyer, 2006
Carpophthoromyia litterata (Munro, 1933)
Carpophthoromyia nigribasis (Enderlein, 1920)
Carpophthoromyia procera (Enderlein, 1920)
Carpophthoromyia pseudotritea Bezzi, 1918
Carpophthoromyia radulata De Meyer, 2006
Carpophthoromyia schoutedeni De Meyer, 2006
Carpophthoromyia scutellata (Walker, 1853)
Carpophthoromyia speciosa Hancock, 1984
Carpophthoromyia tessmanni (Enderlein, 1920)
Carpophthoromyia tritea (Walker, 1849)
Carpophthoromyia virgata De Meyer, 2006
Carpophthoromyia vittata (Fabricius, 1794)

References

Dacinae
Tephritidae genera
Taxa named by Ernest Edward Austen